Ali Kandi (also Romanized as ʿAlī Kandī; also known as Maḩmūd Kandī) is a village in Qarah Quyun-e Jonubi Rural District, Qarah Quyun District, Showt County, West Azerbaijan Province, Iran. At the 2006 census, its population was 198, in 48 families.

References 

Populated places in Showt County